The Marianna Limestone is a limestone geologic formation located in Alabama, northwestern Florida, and Mississippi.

It preserves fossils dating back to the Paleogene period of the early Cenozoic Era.

See also
 List of fossiliferous stratigraphic units in Alabama
 List of fossiliferous stratigraphic units in Florida
 List of fossiliferous stratigraphic units in Mississippi

References

 

Limestone formations of the United States
Geologic formations of Alabama
Geologic formations of Florida
Geologic formations of Mississippi
Paleogene Alabama
Paleogene Florida
Paleogene Mississippi
Paleogene stratigraphic units of North America